Highlands Park is a suburb of the New Zealand city of New Plymouth.

History

In 2011, a local chapter of the Exclusive Brethren proposed building a church in Highlands Park, near most of their 40 members lived nearby. Three nearby residents supported the proposal, but three others opposed it.

As of February 2019, an audit by Taranaki Regional Council found Highlands Park had low levels of recycling contamination, compared to most other New Plymouth suburbs.

In June 2019, a man was arrested on arson charges, after a fire broke out in his Highlands Park home.

In September 2019, a worker at a Highlands Park rest home began taking her newborn black lamb to entertain residents.

Demographics

Highlands Park had a population of 3,318 at the 2018 New Zealand census, an increase of 309 people (10.3%) since the 2013 census, and an increase of 828 people (33.3%) since the 2006 census. There were 1,200 households, comprising 1,590 males and 1,725 females, giving a sex ratio of 0.92 males per female. The median age was 49.2 years (compared with 37.4 years nationally), with 597 people (18.0%) aged under 15 years, 381 (11.5%) aged 15 to 29, 1,494 (45.0%) aged 30 to 64, and 852 (25.7%) aged 65 or older.

Ethnicities were 88.4% European/Pākehā, 7.2% Māori, 0.8% Pacific peoples, 7.1% Asian, and 3.5% other ethnicities. People may identify with more than one ethnicity.

The percentage of people born overseas was 21.8, compared with 27.1% nationally.

Although some people chose not to answer the census's question about religious affiliation, 44.8% had no religion, 45.1% were Christian, 0.1% had Māori religious beliefs, 1.1% were Hindu, 1.3% were Muslim, 0.6% were Buddhist and 1.4% had other religions.

Of those at least 15 years old, 639 (23.5%) people had a bachelor's or higher degree, and 510 (18.7%) people had no formal qualifications. The median income was $34,200, compared with $31,800 nationally. 636 people (23.4%) earned over $70,000 compared to 17.2% nationally. The employment status of those at least 15 was that 1,230 (45.2%) people were employed full-time, 393 (14.4%) were part-time, and 72 (2.6%) were unemployed.

References

Populated places in Taranaki
Suburbs of New Plymouth